Kathleen Mavourneen is a lost 1919 American silent drama film directed by Charles J. Brabin and starring his wife Theda Bara. It was produced and distributed by Fox Film Corporation. A much filmed story based on the poem, Kathleen Mavourneen, by Annie Crawford and play by Dion Boucicault.

Plot
As described in a film magazine, Kathleen (Bara) and Terence (McKee), Irish peasants, plan their wedding in anticipation of a lifetime of happiness. Their dreams are broken by the Squire of Traise (McDermott), attracted by Kathleen's beauty, and a forced marriage to him is the result. A while later the Squire meets Lady Clancarthy (Harris), who possesses vast estates and funds, and is convinced that he can win her if he was free of Kathleen. He lures Kathleen to a lonely spot in the woods and leaves her. After being deserted by her husband, she is set upon by ruffians, and rescued only by the timely arrival of Terence, who kills one of her assailants. Terence is tried and found guilty, the evidence supporting a theory that he lured Kathleen into the woods for a foul purpose and killed the man who came to her rescue. He pays the death penalty on the gallows, whereupon Kathleen wakes to find it was all a dream and preparations for the wedding follow.

Cast
Theda Bara as Kathleen Mavourneen
Edward O'Connor as Kathleen's father
Jennie Dickerson as Kathleen's mother
Raymond McKee as Terence O'Moore
Marc McDermott as The Squire of Traise
Marcia Harris as Lady Clancarthy
Henry Hallam as Sir John Clancarthy
Harry Gripp as Denis O'Rourke
Morgan Thorpe as Father O'Flynn

See also
1937 Fox vault fire

References

External links

Film still at www.silentfilmstillarchive.com

1919 films
American silent feature films
Films directed by Charles Brabin
American films based on plays
Fox Film films
American black-and-white films
Silent American drama films
1919 drama films
Lost American films
1919 lost films
Lost drama films
1910s American films